Dark is a surname. Notable people with the surname include:

 Alice Elliott Dark, American writer
 Alvin Dark (1922–2014), American baseball player and manager
 Ben Dark (born 1972), Australian television presenter
 Danny Dark (1938–2004), American TV announcer and voice actor
 David Dark, American writer
 Jacqueline Dark, Australian mezzo-soprano
 Gregory Dark (born 1957), American film director
 Johnny Dark (born 1940), American comedian
Lisa Lee Dark (born 1981), Welsh opera singer and voice actress

Fictional characters:

 Joanna Dark, the protagonist in the video game Perfect Dark
 Suman Dark, character in the D.Gray-man series